Büllingen Airfield  in Büllingen, is a ULM-only airfield located in Liège, Wallonia, Belgium. Apart from Ultralight planes, it also hosts model ("R/C") flying. It is the only aerodrome in Belgium's German-speaking area. Like most recreational aerodromes in Belgium, its use is subject to prior permission from the operator.

See also
 List of airports in Belgium

References 

Airports in Liège Province
Büllingen